The country of East Timor is home to 16 Important Bird Areas, as designated by BirdLife International.

IBAs
 Areia Branca no Dolok Oan
 Atauro Island
 Be Malae
 Fatumasin
 Irabere - Iliomar
 Jaco Island
 Loré
 Maubara
 Mount Diatuto
 Monte Mak Fahik - Sarim
 Monte Tatamailau
 Mount Paitchau and Lake Iralalaro
 Subaun
 Sungai Klere
 Tasitolu
 Tilomar

References

'